The Black Hills and Fort Pierre Railroad (BH&FP) was a  narrow gauge railroad in the Black Hills of the U.S. state of South Dakota. It was created by the Homestake Mining Company and initially ran from Lead to Calcite and Piedmont by way of Elk Creek. An alternate route was established to Piedmont and Calcite by way of Nemo and Stagebarn Canyon after numerous washouts made the Elk Creek route unviable. There was also a branch from the Nemo line connecting Este with a logging camp at Merritt.

History

The line was originally intended to haul timber to the Homestake Mining Company in Lead. On June 15, 1881, the railroad company was incorporated under the name Black Hills Railroad Company. The name was changed to the Black Hills and Fort Pierre Railroad on July 10, 1882. On November 29, 1881, a mule team hauled the first locomotive, a Porter 2-6-0, from Fort Pierre to Lead. The first track was laid from Lead to Woodville in 1881, and in 1886, the track was extended  to Bucks. In 1890, the line was extended  to Piedmont.

On July 28, 1901, the Burlington and Missouri River Railroad, which was a subsidiary of the Chicago, Burlington and Quincy Railroad (CB&Q), bought the railroad. The CB&Q handled construction after July 1901. The three-rail line was then built from Lead to the Homestake Mine. In the 1920s, increasing automobile traffic led to the decline of the railroad. The Calcite Mine, the only source of traffic remaining on the railroad at the time, was planned to shut down. On October 25, 1929, plans to shut down the railroad were completed; permission to do so from the state and federal governments was received on December 14. The railroad operated until March 20, 1930, and the track was dismantled that spring. The company was officially disestablished in 1932.

See also
 Deadwood Central Railroad
 List of South Dakota railroads

Footnotes

References

External links

Defunct South Dakota railroads
Historic American Engineering Record in South Dakota
Narrow gauge railroads in South Dakota
Predecessors of the Chicago, Burlington and Quincy Railroad
Railway lines opened in 1882
Railway lines closed in 1930
Transportation in Pennington County, South Dakota
Transportation in Lawrence County, South Dakota
3 ft gauge railways in the United States
Black Hills
1882 establishments in Dakota Territory
1930 disestablishments in South Dakota